Iroquois Cranberry Growers (ICG) was owned and operated by the Wahta Mohawk Territory, an indigenous peoples community in Central Ontario. The project was started in the 1960s as an economic development venture with just one-half acre of cranberries and has grown to the current . It has provided employment for community members and has helped to support an economic base for community government.

The Wahta Mohawks moved to Wahta Mohawk Territory in 1881 from Oka, Quebec, and traditionally picked and sold cranberries from a bog just north of the Musquash river. That same spot had all the requirements for a commercial cranberry operation. A good supply of water, impermeable peat soils, and an abundant supply of sand comes together at the site. 

This facility closed in 2016 due to a glut in the market.

References

External links 
 

First Nations organizations in Ontario
Cranberries
Mohawk tribe
Companies established in the 1960s
Companies disestablished in 2016
Juice brands
Companies based in Ontario